Aboubacar Doumbia (born 19 April 1995) is a Malian football midfielder for AS Real Bamako.

References

1995 births
Living people
Malian footballers
Mali international footballers
AS Real Bamako players
Association football midfielders
21st-century Malian people
Mali A' international footballers
2022 African Nations Championship players